The 2018 Toronto FC II season is the fourth season in the club's history. The team finished 16th in the Eastern Conference, missing the playoffs. After the season, Toronto FC II voluntarily moved from the second division United Soccer League to the third division USL League One.

Roster

Players
As of June 7, 2018.
The squad of Toronto FC II will be composed of an unrestricted number of first-team players on loan to the reserve team, players signed to TFC II, and TFC Academy players. Academy players who appear in matches with TFC II will retain their college eligibility.

Transfers

In

Out

Loan Out

Competitions

Preseason

United Soccer League

League table

Eastern Conference

Results summary

Results by round

Matches

Statistics

Squad and statistics

|}

Top scorers 
{| class="wikitable sortable alternance"  style="font-size:85%; text-align:center; line-height:14px; width:85%;"
|-
!width=10|Rank
!width=10|Nat.
! scope=col style="width:275px;"|Player
!width=10|Pos.
!width=80|United Soccer League
!width=80|TOTAL
|-
|3|||| Matthew Srbely        || FW ||1||1
|- class="sortbottom"
|3|||| Jordan Hamilton       || FW ||1||1
|- class="sortbottom"
|2|||| Aidan Daniels         || MF ||2||2
|- class="sortbottom"
|3|||| Shaan Hundal          || FW ||1||1
|- class="sortbottom"
|2|||| Luca Uccello          || MF ||2||2
|- class="sortbottom"
|1|||| Ayo Akinola           || FW ||3||3
|- class="sortbottom"
|3|||| Jordan Faria          || MF ||1||1
|- class="sortbottom"
|3|||| Dante Campbell        || MF ||1||1
|- class="sortbottom"
|3|||| Malik Johnson         || MF ||1||1
|- class="sortbottom"
| colspan="4"|Totals|| 13 || 13

Top Assists 
{| class="wikitable sortable alternance"  style="font-size:85%; text-align:center; line-height:14px; width:85%;"
|-
!width=10|Rank
!width=10|Nat.
! scope=col style="width:275px;"|Player
!width=10|Pos.
!width=80|United Soccer League
!width=80|TOTAL
|-
|2|||| Liam Fraser        || FW || 1 ||1
|- class="sortbottom"
|2|||| Shaan Hundal       || FW || 1 ||1
|- class="sortbottom"
|1|||| Mariano Miño       || MF || 2 ||2
|- class="sortbottom"
|1|||| Aidan Daniels      || MF || 2 ||2
|- class="sortbottom"
|2|||| Ayo Akinola        || FW || 1 ||1
|- class="sortbottom"
|2|||| Kyle Bjornethun    || DF || 1 ||1
|- class="sortbottom"
|2|||| Luca Uccello       || MF || 1 ||1
|- class="sortbottom"
|2|||| Luca Petrasso      || MF || 1 ||1
|- class="sortbottom"
|2|||| Malik Johnson      || MF || 1 ||1
|- class="sortbottom"
| colspan="4"|Totals|| 11 || 11

Clean sheets 
{| class="wikitable sortable alternance"  style="font-size:85%; text-align:center; line-height:14px; width:85%;"
|-
!width=10|Rank
!width=10|Nat.
! scope=col style="width:275px;"|Player
!width=10|Pos.
!width=80|United Soccer League
!width=80|TOTAL
|-
|1|||| Angelo Cavalluzzo        || GK || 1 ||1
|-
|1|||| Caleb Patterson-Sewell   || GK || 1 ||1
|- class="sortbottom"
| colspan="4"|Totals|| 2 || 2

Disciplinary record 
{| class="wikitable sortable alternance"  style="font-size:85%; text-align:center; line-height:14px; width:85%;"
|-
! rowspan="2" style="width:10px;"|No.
! rowspan="2" style="width:10px;"|Pos.
! rowspan="2" style="width:10px;"|Nat.
!rowspan="2" scope=col style="width:275px;"|Player
! colspan="2" style="width:80px;"|United Soccer League
! colspan="2" style="width:80px;"|TOTAL
|-
! !!  !!  !!  
|-
|19||FW|||| Ben Spencer    ||2||0||2||0
|-
|20||FW|||| Ayo Akinola                         ||1||0||1||0
|-
|22||FW|||| Jordan Hamilton                     ||1||0||1||0
|-
|27||MF|||| Liam Fraser                         ||1||0||1||0
|-
|36||DF|||| Tim Kübel                           ||1||0||1||0
|-
|37||MF|||| Gideon Waja                         ||1||0||1||0
|-
|38||DF|||| Kyle Bjornethun                     ||4||0||4||0
|-
|43||FW|||| Aikim Andrews                       ||2||0||2||0
|-
|45||MF|||| Luca Uccello                        ||2||0||2||0
|-
|49||DF|||| Robert Boskovic                     ||3||0||3||0
|-
|50||MF|||| Matthew Srbely                      ||1||0||1||0
|-
|52||DF|||| Julian Dunn-Johnson                 ||1||0||1||0
|-
|55||MF|||| Aidan Daniels                       ||1||0||1||0
|- 
|56||MF|||| Malik Johnson                       ||1||0||1||0
|-
|61||DF|||| Antonio Rocco                       ||2||0||2||0
|-
|64||MF|||| Shaan Hundal                        ||0||1||0||1
|-
|70||GK|||| Gianluca Catalano                   ||2||0||2||0
|-
|77||DF|||| Brandon Onkony                      ||3||0||3||0
|- 
|88||MF|||| Mariano Miño                        ||2||0||2||0
|- class="sortbottom"
| colspan="4"|Totals||27||1||27||1

References

External links
 

Toronto FC II seasons
Toronto FC II
Toronto FC II
Toronto FC II